Sherona Forrester (born 4 November 1991) is a Jamaican international football midfielder. She has a BSc. in Economics and a master's degree in Economics and Statistics from the University of the West Indies. In 2015, she was named the 2016 Rhodes Scholar of Jamaica.

External links 
 

1991 births
Living people
Jamaica women's international footballers
Jamaican women's footballers
Jamaican Rhodes Scholars
Women's association football midfielders